Jean Peytel (24 January 1909 – 16 August 2002) was a French sailor. He competed in the mixed two person keelboat at the 1932 and 1948 Summer Olympics. In between, he competed in the mixed 6 metres at the 1936 Summer Olympics. His final competition was in the mixed three person keelboat at the 1960 Summer Olympics.

References

1909 births
2002 deaths
French male sailors (sport)
Olympic sailors of France
Sailors at the 1932 Summer Olympics – Star
Sailors at the 1936 Summer Olympics – 6 Metre
Sailors at the 1948 Summer Olympics – Star
Sailors at the 1960 Summer Olympics – Dragon